Sun Peng (Chinese: 孙鹏; born October 19, 1983) is a Chinese tennis player. He was the national singles champion in 2005.

Peng and Zeng Shaoxuan were the only male singles competitors for China at the 2008 Summer Olympics.

See also
Tennis in China

External links

References
 China at the 2008 Summer Olympics
  10th National Games, beating Zeng Shao-Xuan 6–2, 6–3 Friday in Nanjing.

Living people
Chinese male tennis players
Hopman Cup competitors
Olympic tennis players of China
Tennis players at the 2008 Summer Olympics
1983 births
Tennis players from Liaoning
Tennis players at the 2006 Asian Games
Sportspeople from Anshan
Asian Games competitors for China
21st-century Chinese people